The Pacific Coast Way is an Australian road route from Sydney, New South Wales to Cairns in Queensland. It has been designated by the Queensland Government as a State Strategic Touring Route.

The route
The route in New South Wales is generally via the Pacific Motorway / Pacific Highway to the Gold Coast at the Queensland border.
The route in Queensland follows the Pacific Motorway to Brisbane and then the Bruce Highway to Cairns.

Tourism Queensland website
The organisation "Tourism and Events Queensland" has established a website titled "Pacific Coast Way" that shows a map of the route from the Gold Coast to Cairns, with side trips to the Sunshine Coast, Hervey Bay, Bundaberg, Gladstone, Airlie Beach and Mission Beach. It provides some information about each of the following segments: 
 Gold Coast to Brisbane (intersection with Adventure Way and Warrego Way)
 Brisbane to Maroochydore
 Maroochydore to Gympie
 Gympie to Hervey Bay
 Hervey Bay to Bundaberg
 Bundaberg to Gin Gin
 Gin Gin to Gladstone
 Gladstone to Rockhampton (intersection with Australia's Country Way, Leichhardt Way and Capricorn Way)
 Rockhampton to Mackay
 Mackay to Airlie Beach
 Airlie Beach to Bowen
 Bowen to Home Hill
 Home Hill to Townsville (intersection with Overlanders Way)
 Townsville to Ingham
 Ingham to Cardwell
 Cardwell to Mission Beach
 Mission Beach to Cairns

See also
 Queensland Electric Super Highway

References 

State Strategic Touring Routes in Queensland